Gildersleeve's Ghost is a 1944 American comedy film directed by Gordon Douglas from an original screenplay by Robert E. Kent.  It is the fourth and final film in the Gildersleeve's series, all of which were produced and distributed by RKO Radio Pictures, based on the popular NBC radio program, The Great Gildersleeve, created by Leonard L. Levinson and itself a spin-off of Fibber McGee and Molly. Released on September 6, 1944, the film stars Harold Peary, Marion Martin, Richard LeGrand, Amelita Ward, Freddie Mercer, and Margie Stewart.

Plot
Gildersleeve is running for police commissioner against the incumbent Haley. He believes he can boost his chances by exposing the questionable experiments being conducted by scientist Wells. His attempts to do so are somewhat hindered by the ghosts of two of his ancestors (both also played by Peary), as well as an invisible woman and a lovesick gorilla—and naturally everyone thinks he's losing his mind.

Cast
 Harold Peary as Throckmorton P. Gildersleeve / Ghost of Randolph Q. Gildersleeve / Ghost of Jonathan Q. Gildersleeve
 Marion Martin as Terry Vance
 Richard LeGrand as Mr. Peavey
 Amelita Ward as Marie 
 Freddie Mercer as Leroy Forrester
 Margie Stewart as Marjorie Forrester
 Marie Blake as Harriet Morgan
 Emory Parnell as Police Commissioner Haley
 Nick Stewart as Chauncey
 Frank Reicher as Dr. John Wells
 Joseph Vitale as Lennox 
 Lillian Randolph as Birdie
 Charles Gemora as the Gorilla (uncredited)

See also
 List of ghost films
 List of American films of 1944

References

External links
 
 
 
 

1944 films
1940s fantasy comedy films
1940s comedy horror films
1940s ghost films
American comedy horror films
American fantasy comedy films
American black-and-white films
Films based on radio series
Films directed by Gordon Douglas
American ghost films
Mad scientist films
RKO Pictures films
1944 comedy films
1944 horror films
1940s English-language films
1940s American films
The Great Gildersleeve